This is a list of persons who have served as members of U.S. state legislatures while enrolled in third parties. For purposes of this list, a third party is defined as any party other than the Democratic Party or the Republican Party. This list spans the period from 1856 to the present. The time period listed beside each elected official's name is the time period when that elected official has served as a state legislator while enrolled as a member of a third party. State legislators who are independent (in other words, not enrolled in a political party) are not included in this list.

Alaska
Current
Alaska House of Representatives:
 Bryce Edgmon (2019–present). Elected as a Democrat in 2007, he switched affiliations to Independent after becoming Speaker of the House
 Dan Ortiz (2015–present).
Josiah Patkotak (2021–present).
Calvin Schrage (2021–present)

Historical
Alaska House of Representatives:
 Jay Hammond (1958–1960). Future governor Hammond served in the 1st Alaska State Legislature as an independent, and later served as a Republican.
 Robert Ditman (1960–1962). Originally elected as an independent, Ditman later served as a Democrat.
 Frank R. Ferguson (1972–1974). Ferguson was elected as a write-in after losing the Democratic primary as an incumbent.  He served in the previous and following legislatures as a Democrat.
 Ken Fanning (1980–1982). The second Libertarian elected to partisan office in the United States, he served one term in the Alaska House of Representatives.
 Andre Marrou (1984–1986). Elected as a Libertarian for one term. He was Ron Paul's running mate in 1988 and the Libertarian nominee for president in 1992.
 Dick Randolph (1978–1982). Previously elected as a Republican, Randolph switched parties and became the first Libertarian elected to a partisan office in the United States in 1978. Randolph ran as the Libertarian nominee for governor in 1982.
Alaska Territorial Legislature:
 Elwood Bruner (1913). Bruner served as a Republican in the California State Assembly, but served in the Alaska Territorial Senate as an Independent.
 Dan Sutherland (1913–1919). Sutherland served in the Alaska Territorial Senate as an Independent, but served in the United States House of Representatives as a Republican.
 B.F. Millard (1913–1915)
 L.V. Ray
 J.M. Tanner (1913). Tanner would serve in future territorial senates as a Democrat.

Arkansas
Current

 Jim Hendren (2013–present). Elected as a Republican, changed his registration to Independent in 2021.

Historical
 Nate Bell (2015–2017). Originally elected in 2011 as a Republican, Bell switched his affiliation to Independent in 2015.
 Richard Carroll (2009–2011). Initially elected to the Arkansas House of Representatives as a Green in 2008, he switched to the Democratic Party in 2009.
 Fred Smith (2013–2015). Smith was originally elected to the Arkansas House of Representatives as a Democrat in 2010, but was forced to give up his seat after a conviction. The conviction was expunged, but the Democrats refused to have him as their candidate in 2012. He ran for re-election as a Green in 2013 and won.

California
 Audie Bock (1999–2000). Bock was elected to the California State Assembly as a Green in a special election.
Chad Meyes (2014–2022). Meyes was elected as a Republican, changed his party affiliation to Independent in 2019 and re-elected as an Independent in 2020.

Connecticut
 Edwin Gomes (2015–2019). Gomes, a former Democratic member of the Connecticut Senate, was elected to the office for a second time as a member of the Working Families Party. He is the first member of the Working Families Party to win a legislative seat outside of New York and one of the first to win a seat without electoral fusion. Gomes made efforts to regain the Democratic Party's backing in the 2016 primary elections.

Kansas 

 Dennis Pyle (2005–present) Elected as a Republican, changed his registration in 2022 to Independent.

Louisiana
Roy Adams (2019–present). Elected as an independent for the Louisiana House's 62nd district.
Joseph Marino III (2016–present). Elected as an independent for the Louisiana House's 85th district.

Maine
Maine House of Representatives:

Current
Jeffrey Evangelos (2012-2016, 2018–present). Elected as independent.
Willian Pluecker (2018–present). Elected as independent.
Walter Riseman (2018–present). Elected as independent.
Sophia Warren (2020–present). Elected as independent.

Former
 John Andrews (2020–2022). Elected as a Republican, left party and joined the Libertarian Party of Maine due to conflict regarding committee assignments. In 2022, Andrews rejoined the Republican Party after the Libertarian Party of Maine lost its status as an official political party in the state.
 Henry John Bear (2013-2019). Elected as a Democrat representing the Houlton Band of Maliseet Indians, he later joined the Maine Green Independent Party in 2017.
 Ralph Chapman (2017–2019). Elected as a Democrat, he later unenrolled and later joined the Maine Green Independent Party in 2017.
 John Eder (2002–2006). Member of the Maine Green Independent Party.
 Major Knight (1880). Member of the Greenback Party.

Maryland
 Shane Robinson (2011-2019). Elected as a Democrat representing the Maryland House of Delegates' 39th district, he joined the Green Party in 2018.

Massachusetts
Massachusetts House of Representatives:
 Susannah Whipps (2017–present) Elected as a Republican in 2014, she changed her affiliation to Independent in August 2017, stating that serving as an unenrolled member would help her to reach out to both Democrats and Republicans. She won her re-election in 2018 with 70% of the vote within her constituency.

Michigan
Bert F. Crapser (1913–1914), Elected to the Michigan House of Representatives as a Progressive in 1912, and served one term ending in 1914.
Milton B. Hine (1879–1880), Elected to the Michigan Senate as a Greenbacker in 1878, and served one term ending in 1880.
J. Weston Hutchins (1913–1914), Elected to the Michigan House of Representatives as a Progressive in 1912, and served one term ending in 1914.

Montana
 Rick Jore (2000–2001; 2007–2009). Jore served as a Republican in the Montana House of Representatives from 1995 to 2000. In 2000, he left the Republican Party to seek a fourth term as a member of the Constitution Party. He then ran four times as a Constitution Party candidate before winning office in 2006.

Nebraska
(Note: While Nebraska's unicameral legislature is nominally nonpartisan, most members belong to and are supported by one of the two major political parties.)
 Ernie Chambers (1971-2009, 2013-2020). Formerly the sole non-affiliated member in the Nebraska legislature, belonging to neither the Democratic nor Republican parties. Chambers was a former member of the New Alliance Party.
 Laura Ebke (2016–2019). Elected as a Republican-endorsed candidate, she joined the Libertarian Party in 2016.

Nevada
 John Moore (2016). Elected to the Nevada Assembly as a Republican, Moore switched to Libertarian Party in 2016.

New Hampshire
Historical
New Hampshire House of Representatives:
 Max Abramson. Abramson has held office as a Republican and a Libertarian.
 Andy Borsa. Elected in 1992 as a Libertarian.
 Caleb Q. Dyer. (2016-2018) Elected in 2016 as a Republican. He switched his party affiliation to Libertarian in 2017.
 Don Gorman (1992–2000). Elected in 1992 as a Libertarian. He ran for the Libertarian presidential nomination in 2000, losing to Harry Browne.
 Jim McClarin (1994–1996). Elected as a Libertarian.
 Brandon Phinney. Libertarian member since 2017.
 Finlay Rothhaus (1991–1995). Originally a member of the Reform Party, Rothhaus joined the Libertarian Party in 1991.
 Joseph Stallcop. Elected in 2016, he became a Libertarian in 2017.
 Steve Vaillancourt (1996–2002, 2006–2014). Originally elected as a Democrat, he was re-elected on the Libertarian ticket in 2000 before choosing to retire. He ran again for state house in 2006 as a Republican.
 Calvin Warburton (1992–1995). Elected as a Libertarian.

New Jersey
Matt Ahearn (2002-2004). Elected as a Democrat. He switched his party affiliation to Green following dissatisfaction with the Democrats for corruption.

New Mexico 
New Mexico House of Representatives:

 Phelps Anderson (2019–present). Elected as a Republican, changed his registration in 2021 to Independent.

New Mexico Senate:

 Jacob Candelaria (2013–present). Elected as a Democrat, changed his registration in 2021 to Independent.

New York
New York State Assembly:
 Timothy P. Gordon (2007–2010). Served two terms in the Assembly as a member of the Independence Party.
 Diana Richardson (2015–present). Was elected as a member of the Working Families Party in a 2015 special election in which no Democratic candidate was on the ballot. She is the first member of the New York Working Families Party to be elected only on the Working Families ballot line.
 Fred Thiele (2009–2022). Thiele was originally elected to the Assembly as a member of the Republican Party, but on October 1, 2009 switched to the Independence Party of New York and caucused with the Democrats. In 2022, Thiele officially switched to the Democratic Party, after the Independence Party of New York lost its status as an official political party in New York State.
 Angela Wozniak (2015–2016). A member of the Conservative Party, Wozniak was elected to the New York State Assembly in 2014. She caucused with the Republicans.

Rhode Island
Rhode Island House of Representatives:
 Daniel P. Gordon (2011–2012). After being expelled from the Republican Party, Gordon joined the Libertarian Party, becoming the party's sole legislator during his tenure.

South Carolina 
South Carolina House of Representatives

 Mia McLeod (2011–present). Elected as a Democrat, changed his registration in 2023 to Independent.

Tennessee 
Tennessee House of Representatives

 John Windle (2022–2023). Elected as a Democrat, changed his registration in 2022 to Independent.

Utah
 Mark B. Madsen (2016). Chose in July 2016 to be a Libertarian for the remainder of his final term in the Utah Senate.

Vermont
Current Vermont House of Representatives:

 Mollie S. Burke. Progressive member representing Windham-2-2.
 Barbara Murphy Independent member from 2015–present 
 Laura Sibilia Independent member from 2015–present 
 Kelly Pajala Independent member from 2017–present 
 Terry Norris Independent member from 2017–present 

Historical:
 Terry Bouricius. Served as a Progressive member from 1991 to 2001.
 Robin Chesnut-Tangerman. Progressive member representing Rutland-Bennington.
 Dean Corren. Served as a Progressive member from 1992 to 2000. He was the nominee of both the Progressive Party and the Democratic Party for lieutenant governor in 2014.
 Susan Davis. Progressive member representing Orange-1.
 Winston Dowland. Served as a Progressive member from 2003 to 2007.
 Carina Driscoll. Served as a Progressive member. She is the step-daughter of Independent U.S. Senator Bernie Sanders.
 Sarah Edwards. Served as a Progressive member from 2003 to 2013.
 Diana Gonzalez. Progressive member representing Chittenden-6-7.
 Sandy Haas. Progressive member representing Windsor-Rutland.
Ben Jickling. Served as an Independent from 2017 to 2019.
 Bob Kiss. Progressive member representing Chittenden-3-4 from 2001 to 2006. He later ran for Senate as an Independent, finishing eighth of fourteen candidates running for six seats.
 Paul Lefebvre. Served as an Independent from 2020 to 2023. 
 Christopher Pearson. Progressive member representing Chittenden-6-4.
 Dexter Randall. Served as a Progressive.
 Neil Randall. Served as a Libertarian from 1998 to 2002.
 Tom Smith. Served as a Progressive member.

Vermont Senate:

Historical
 Tim Ashe. A Progressive member who runs with the support of the Democratic and Progressive parties through electoral fusion.
 Anthony Pollina. A Progressive member who runs with the support of the Democratic and Progressive parties through electoral fusion.
 David Zuckerman. A Progressive member who runs with the support of the Democratic and Progressive parties through electoral fusion. As Progressive/Democrat, he was sworn in as lieutenant governor on January 5, 2017.

Wyoming
 Marshall Burt (2021–2023), Libertarian member of the Wyoming House of Representatives
Jim Roscoe (2019–2023), Independent member of the Wyoming House of Representatives.

References

Lists of state political office-holders in the United States

Third party (United States)